The Balcony (French: Le balcon) is an 1868-69 oil painting by the French painter Édouard Manet. It depicts four figures on a balcony, one of whom is sitting: the painter Berthe Morisot, who married Manet's brother Eugène in 1874. In the centre is the painter Jean Baptiste Antoine Guillemet.  On the right is Fanny Claus, a violinist.  The fourth figure, partially obscured in the interior's background, is possibly Léon Leenhoff, Manet's son. It was exhibited at the Paris Salon of 1869, and then kept by Manet until his death in 1883.  It was sold to the painter Gustave Caillebotte in 1884, who left it to the French state in 1894.  It is currently held at the Musée d'Orsay, in Paris.

Inspiration and description
The painting, inspired by Majas on the Balcony by Francisco Goya, was created at the same time and with the same purpose as Luncheon in the Studio.

The three characters, who were all friends of Manet, seem to be disconnected from each other: while Berthe Morisot, on the left, looks like a romantic and inaccessible heroine, the young violinist Fanny Claus and the painter Antoine Guillemet seem to display indifference. The boy in the background is probably Manet's son, Léon. Just behind the railings, there are a hydrangea in a ceramic pot, and a dog with a ball below Morisot's chair.

This was the first portrait of Morisot by Manet.  Manet adopts a restrained colour palette, dominated by white, green and black, with accents of blue (Guillemet's tie) and red (Morisot's fan).

Manet made many preparatory studies, painting the four subjects individually many times: Guillemet as many as fifteen times.  A preparatory study for The Balcony was painted at Boulogne in 1868.  This unfinished portrait of Fanny Claus, the closest friend of Manet’s wife Suzanne Leenhoff; Claus married Manet's friend Pierre Prins in 1869.  The work was bought after Manet's death in a studio sale by John Singer Sargent.  The portrait had only been seen once in public since it was first painted in 1868, but in 2012 the Ashmolean Museum in Oxford succeeded in raising the funds to acquire it and keep it permanently in a public collection in the United Kingdom.

Reception
The painting was not well received when it was exhibited at the Paris Salon in 1869. The press considered the painting as "discordant". The contrast of colours (the background completely black, the white faces and clothes, the blue tie of the man, and the green railings) contributes to create an atmosphere of "mystery".

Manet deliberately eschewed any sense of connection between the figures, treating them more like objects in a still life than living people.  None of them looks at the others.  One commentator, the caricaturist Cham, sarcastically called for the shutters to be closed.  Morisot herself said " ("I look more peculiar than ugly; it seems that people asking about it have used the words femme fatale to describe me.").  Albert Wolff described it as "coarse art"" at "the level of house painters".

Manet kept the painting until his death in 1883, hanging it near his painting of Olympia. It was bought from the sale of Manet's estate in February 1884 by Gustave Caillebotte, who paid 3,000 francs. Caillebotte displayed it in a prominent position in his house at Gennevilliers. On his death in 1894, Caillebotte's will left the painting, with other works, to the French state.

Surrealist René Magritte painted Perspective II: Manet's Balcony in 1950, a commentary on the present work. On the balcony are four coffins (one "seated") in place of the four people. Michel Foucault said of Magritte's painting, "" (It is this limit of life and death, of light and darkness, which is there, manifested by these three characters). Magritte told Foucault, "For me the setting of The Balcony offered a suitable place to put coffins. The 'mechanism' at work here might form the object of a learned explanation, which I am unable to provide. The explanation would be valid, indeed beyond question, but that would not make it any less mysterious."

Manet's Flaneuse: Portrait of Mademoiselle Claus 
Manet's Portrait of Mademoiselle Claus has been considered a sketch for The Balcony. As a preparatory sketch for the finished product, Mademoiselle Claus' portrait captures the artist's overarching intentions. It is her peering eyes over the balcony that suggest her position as a flaneuse, the feminine equivalent to the flâneur who would have been described at the time as a passante. Nesci (2007) introduces the concept of the flaneuse and positions the existence of this feminine figure as early as the 1830s. By scrutinising the masculine figure of the flaneur and uncovering the figure of the flaneuse, "helps us question the conditions of inclusion and exclusion of public urban life". Both the balcony context of The Balcony and the Portrait depict this question of inclusion and exclusion of public urban life, placing women on a balcony peering onto (and therefore gazing) the public urban life, whilst retaining a close physical proximity with their domestic environment (the inside of the house alluded to by the dark space between the two green windows. This act of gazing onto public urban life and reflecting on it without being a part of it is "central to the definition of the flaneur". Manet's The Balcony and the individual sketches he produced prior to the full composition and therefore examples of what 21st century scholars are unravelling in their scrutiny of the masculine flaneur and uncovering of the existence of a very present flaneuse.

Gallery

References

External links

Impressionism : a centenary exhibition, the Metropolitan Museum of Art, December 12, 1974-February 10, 1975, fully digitized text from The Metropolitan Museum of Art libraries, pp. 120–123.
The Balcony, Musée d'Orsay

Paintings by Édouard Manet
1868 paintings
Paintings in the collection of the Musée d'Orsay
Dogs in art